Ramji may refer to:

 Ramji (cinematographer), Indian film cinematographer
 Ramji (actor), Indian film choreographer and actor